The Middle East Special Event & Exhibition Show (MESE), formerly known as the Middle East Event Show, is an annual exhibition held at Dubai for Meetings, incentives, conferencing, exhibitions (MICE), events and entertainment industry.  Launched in 2011 the show provides the regional events industry with a platform to promote their products and services event managers, marketers and other relevant personnel. Previous events, Festivale and Event360, identified a need in the region for an exhibition that covered the whole of the local events industry, and so these were amalgamated to be one event in the Middle East Event Show. In 2018 the event will be re-branded to The Middle East Special Event & Exhibition Show, to be organised under the wings of The Special Event show in the USA.

The Middle East Special Event & Exhibition Show 2018 takes place at the Madinat Jumeirah Resort. The exhibition is organised by Informa KNect365.

Alongside the exhibition, the Middle East Special Event & Exhibition Show runs a series of educational workshops and seminars, which are free to attend.

Awards evening

The Middle East Special Event & Exhibition Awards evening is held annually alongside the show and aims to recognise and reward excellence within the industry. In 2017 the award categories & winners were as follows:

References

External links 
 Middle East EVENT show Official site
 Informa Exhibition Official site
 Event Awards Official site

Events in Dubai
Dubai
Trade fairs in the United Arab Emirates